Jamal Moss (born 31 January 1986) is a male sprinter from Nassau, Bahamas, who mainly competes in the 400m. Moss competed for Hinds Community College. Moss ran the third leg of the  Relay at the 2010 Commonwealth Games,  as well as the third leg for the same event at the 2004 World Junior Championships in Athletics in Grosseto, Italy. 

He won a bronze medal on the  relay at the 2005 CARIFTA Games in Tobago. Moss also competed at the 2005 Pan American Junior Athletics Championships in Winnipeg, Canada.

Personal bests

References

External links
 World Athletics

1986 births
Living people
Bahamian male sprinters
Athletes (track and field) at the 2010 Commonwealth Games
Commonwealth Games competitors for the Bahamas
People from Nassau, Bahamas
Sportspeople from Nassau, Bahamas
Hinds Community College alumni
Junior college men's track and field athletes in the United States